War of 1778 may refer to:

 The Anglo-French War (1778–83)
 The War of the Bavarian Succession